Polyphonic, also known as Polyphonic the Verbose, is an American musician and record producer. He was born Will Freyman and grew up in Champaign, Illinois. His father persuaded him to take classical piano lessons as a child. In middle and high school, he learned to play jazz trombone. He attended college at the University of Illinois at Urbana–Champaign before moving to San Francisco, then to New York City, then back to San Francisco, and finally moving to the Chicago neighborhood of Wicker Park. He subsequently met rapper Serengeti at a party, and the two soon began collaborating. This resulted in the album Don't Give Up, which was released on the Audio 8 Recordings label in 2007. Polyphonic and Serengeti then briefly parted ways, with Polyphonic working with Ben Lamar on the Juba Dance project, before being signed to Anticon by Doseone. Serengeti and Polyphonic then released their second album together, Terradactyl, on Anticon in 2009.

Discography

Solo
Abstract Data Ark (Love Minus Zero, 2006)

With Juba Dance
Orange (Audio 8, 2007)

With Serengeti
Don't Give Up (Audio 8, 2007)
Terradactyl (Anticon, 2009)

As producer
Locket in a Well by Wick (Audio 8, 2006)
Race Trading by Serengeti (Audio 8, 2006)

References

Living people
American hip hop record producers
People from Champaign, Illinois
University of Illinois Urbana-Champaign alumni
Record producers from Illinois
Anticon artists
Year of birth missing (living people)